Lenny Gwata (born 4 January 1974) was a Zimbabwean football defender who passed on in 2010. He survived with a wife Beatah Mangethe who passed on 2 months later and one son.

References

1974 births
Living people
Zimbabwean footballers
Zimbabwe international footballers
Dynamos F.C. players
Association football defenders